Stewart Wolfe Jamieson CBE (4 January 1903 – 4 May 1975) was an Australian diplomat, journalist, and lawyer.

After attending The King's School, Sydney, Jamieson graduated from the University of Sydney with a Bachelor of Arts before studying law at the University of Oxford. He worked as a lawyer and journalist in the late 1920s and the 1930s, and enlisted with the Royal Australian Air Force in World War II. After the war, he joined Australia's diplomatic service. In a 20-year diplomatic career, he held a number of consular and ambassadorial posts, including as Australia's high commissioner to Ghana (1958–1960), ambassador to Brazil (1960–1962), ambassador to the Soviet Union (1962–1965) and Aabassador to Sweden (1964–1965).

References

1903 births
1975 deaths
20th-century Australian lawyers
Ambassadors of Australia to the Soviet Union
Ambassadors of Australia to Brazil
High Commissioners of Australia to Ghana
Ambassadors of Australia to Sweden
Consuls-General of Australia in San Francisco
Australian Commanders of the Order of the British Empire
University of Sydney alumni
People educated at The King's School, Parramatta
Alumni of Balliol College, Oxford
20th-century Australian journalists